Kalyana Vaibhogame is a 2016 Indian Telugu romantic comedy  film written and directed by B. V. Nandini Reddy. Produced by  K.L.Damodar Prasad under Sri Ranjith Movies the film stars Naga Shourya and Malavika Nair and Raasi, Aishwarya, Raj Mudhiraj and Anand in the supporting roles. The film was released worldwide on 4 March 2016 to critical acclaim.

Cast
 Naga Shourya as Shourya
 Malavika Nair as Divya
 Raasi as Prameela Devi
 Anand
 Pragathi
 Naveen Neni
 Aishwarya
 Thagubothu Ramesh as Goutham, Software Engineer
 Geetha Singh as Punjabi Guest
 Snigdha
 Pearle Maaney as Vaidehi
 Raj Madiraju

Soundtrack

The film's music was composed by Kalyan Koduri and released by Madhura Audio.

Release and reception
Kalyana Vaibhogame was released on  4 March 2016 in 300 screens across Telangana and Andhra Pradesh and received critical acclaim. The distribution rights for Nizam regions were given to Abhishek Pictures. The distribution rights for North India and Orissa regions were by Golden Tree Entertainment Company.

US Box Office Gross
Kalyana Vaibhogame collected $13,257  during the Thursday Premieres and collected $32,365 on Friday at the US box office. It collected $64,237 on Saturday taking the total to $109,859. Kalyana Vaibhogame has collected $142,011 (₹ 95.51 lakh) from 68 screens and made better collection than Priyanka Chopra's Bollywood movie Jai Gangaajal at the US box office in the first weekend. It has collected $46,656 at the US box office in its second weekend and its 10-day US total collection stands at $227,092 (₹  1.53 crore).

References

External links
 

2010s Telugu-language films
2016 films
Films directed by B. V. Nandini Reddy